The Atlanta Falcons, a professional American football team based in Atlanta, are part of the National Football Conference South Division. They joined the National Football League (NFL) as an expansion team for the 1966 season and became the first NFL franchise in the Southeastern United States. They first participated in the 1966 NFL Annual Player Selection Meeting, more commonly known as the NFL Draft. In the NFL Draft, each NFL franchise annually seeks to add new players to its roster. Teams are ranked in reverse order based on the previous season's record, with the worst record picking first, the second-worst picking second and so on. The two exceptions to this order are made for teams that appeared in the previous Super Bowl; the Super Bowl champion always picks 32nd, and the Super Bowl loser always picks 31st. Teams have the option of trading away their picks to other teams for different picks, players, cash, or a combination thereof. Thus, it is not uncommon for a team's actual draft pick to differ from their assigned draft pick, or for a team to have extra or no draft picks in any round due to these trades.

In their first draft, the Falcons had two picks in the first round. These selections were Tommy Nobis, a linebacker from Texas, and Randy Johnson, a quarterback from Texas A&I. The Falcons have selected number one overall four times: Tommy Nobis, Steve Bartkowski, Aundray Bruce, and Michael Vick. The team has also selected number two overall three times and number three overall two times. The Falcons have selected players from Florida State University four times, the most from any university. The team's most recent first-round selection was Drake London, a wide receiver from the University of Southern California.

Key

Player selections

Footnotes 

 The Falcons traded the #3 overall pick of the 1967 draft to the San Francisco 49ers for wide receiver Bernie Casey, offensive tackle Jim Wilson, and defensive end Jim Norton.
 The Falcons traded their #14 overall pick to the Houston Oilers for defensive tackle Mike Tilleman.
 The Falcons traded their #17 overall pick to the Minnesota Vikings along with quarterback Bob Berry for quarterback Bob Lee and linebacker Lonnie Warwick.
 The Falcons traded their #3 overall pick along with offensive tackle George Kunz to Baltimore Colts for the Colts' first and sixth-round picks.
 The Falcons acquired this pick from the St. Louis Cardinals.
 The Falcons traded their #4 overall pick along with a third-round pick to the Minnesota Vikings for the #2 overall pick.
 The Falcons traded their 1985 second-round pick and 1986 second-round pick to the Washington Redskins for the Redskins' 1985 second-round pick and the #17 overall pick in 1986.
 The Falcons acquired this pick from the Cincinnati Bengals for the second, fourth, and tenth-round picks.
 The Falcons traded their #1 overall pick to the Indianapolis Colts for the Colts' fifth-round pick in 1990, #13 overall pick in 1991, wide receiver Andre Rison, and offensive tackle Chris Hinton. 
 The Falcons acquired this pick from the Washington Redskins.
 The Falcons acquired this pick from the New England Patriots.
 The Falcons traded their #7 overall pick along with the third-round pick in 1994 and the #19 overall pick in 1996 to the Indianapolis Colts for quarterback Jeff George.
 The Falcons traded their #10 overall pick to the Cleveland Browns for the #26 pick and running back Eric Metcalf.

 The Falcons acquired this pick along with the second, third, and fourth-round picks from the Seattle Seahawks for the #11 overall pick along with the third-round pick.
 The Falcons traded their #5 overall pick to the Baltimore Ravens for the 1999 second-round pick.
 The Falcons traded their #5 overall pick along with wide receiver Tim Dwight, the 2002 second and 2001 third-round picks to the San Diego Chargers for the #1 overall pick.
 The Falcons traded their #17 overall pick to the Oakland Raiders for the #18 overall pick and the fifth-round pick.
 The Falcons traded their #23 overall pick to the Buffalo Bills for wide receiver Peerless Price.
 The Falcons traded their second, third, and fourth-round picks to the Indianapolis Colts for the #29 overall and third-round picks.
 The Falcons traded their #15 overall pick to the Denver Broncos for the #29 overall, third-round and a 2007 fourth-round picks. The Falcons then traded the #29 overall pick to the New York Jets for defensive end John Abraham.
 The Falcons traded their #10 overall pick and quarterback Matt Schaub to the Houston Texans for the #8 overall, second-round, and 2008 second-round picks.
 The Falcons traded two second-round picks and a fourth-round pick to the Washington Redskins for the #21 overall pick along with the third and fifth-round picks.
 The Falcons traded their #27 overall pick along with second-round, fourth-round and a 2012 first-round and fourth-round picks to the Cleveland Browns for the #6 overall pick .
 The Falcons traded their #30 overall pick along with third- (92nd), and sixth- (198th) round selections to the St. Louis Rams in exchange for St. Louis 2013 #22nd overall pick along with a 7th-round selection.
 The Falcons traded their #31 overall pick along with third- (95th), and seventh- (249th) round selections to the Seattle Seahawks in exchange for Seattle's 2017 #26th overall pick.
 The Falcons traded picks #45(second round) and #79 (third round) to the Los Ángeles Rams. In exchange, the Falcons got the Rams' #31 and #203 (sixth round) Picks

References
General
 
 

Specific

Atlanta Falcons

First round draft picks